The Pingshan Open was a professional tennis tournament played on hardcourts. The event was part of the ATP Challenger Tour and the ITF Women's Circuit, and held in Shenzhen, China from 2014 to 2019.

Past finals

Men's singles

Women's singles

Men's doubles

Women's doubles

External links
 ITF search

 
ITF Women's World Tennis Tour
Hard court tennis tournaments
Tennis tournaments in China
Recurring sporting events established in 2014
2014 establishments in China
Sport in Shenzhen
ATP Challenger Tour
Sports competitions in Guangdong